Málaga, or Malaga, is a port city in the province of Málaga in Andalusia, Southern Spain.

Malaga may also refer to

Geography 
 Málaga, port city in the province of Málaga in Andalusia, Southern Spain
 Málaga (province), the province that takes its name from that city
 Vélez-Málaga, Málaga, smaller city in the east of the same Spanish province
 Malaga, Western Australia, suburb of Perth, Western Australia
 Málaga, Santander, municipality in Colombia, capital of the Province of García Rovira, Santander Department, Colombia
 Malaga, California, community in Fresno County, California
 Malaga Island, an island in Maine that housed a small interracial community after the American Civil War
 Malaga, New Jersey, unincorporated area in Franklin Township, Gloucester County, New Jersey
 Malaga, New Mexico, unincorporated area in Eddy County, New Mexico
 Malaga, Ohio, unincorporated area in Ohio
 Malaga, Washington, unincorporated area in Chelan County, Washington

Films 

 Malaga (1954 film), a film directed by Richard Sale
 Malaga (1960 film), starring Trevor Howard and Dorothy Dandridge

Other 
 352834 Málaga, asteroid named after the Spanish port city
 Málaga (Spanish Congress Electoral District) electoral district covering the Spanish province
 Málaga (Andalusian Parliament Electoral District) electoral district covering the Andalusian province
 Malaga (wine), fortified wine originating in Málaga
 Malaga DO, Spanish wine region
 Málaga CF, football club in Málaga
 CD Málaga, former football club in Málaga
 SEAT Malaga, model of car